Boisson is a French surname meaning "drink". Notable people with the surname include:

Andrée Boisson (1900–1973), French fencer
Christine Boisson (born 1956), French actress
Francis Boisson (born 1928), Monegasque sport shooter
Noëlle Boisson (born 1944), French film editor
Pierre Boisson (born 1930), Monegasque sport shooter

French-language surnames